Mumbai Taxi  is a Malayalam film directed by Fazil Basheer, released on 7 August 2015 in theatres. The film stars Badusha Mohammed as the central character, with Riyaz Fazzan, Mareena Michael, Babu Jose, Shivaji Guruvayoor, Sreejith Ravi, Tini Tom.This movie was dubbed in Tamil, Telugu and Hindi as same title.

Synopsis
The film is about how a set of officials try to deal with a bomb threat happens in a single day in the city of Mumbai. The movie revolves around a taxi driver in Mumbai. Badusha does the lead role of Bhagath, a taxi driver. Marina Michael Kurushingal does the female lead. She plays Nandhita, a passenger in the taxi driven by Bhagath. A thrilling story follows with the arrival of an anonymous message to the special office under Anti Terrorist Squad.

References

External links
 

2015 films
2010s Malayalam-language films
2015 directorial debut films